The Jackson Shore Apartments are a historic apartment building in the Hyde Park neighborhood of Chicago, Illinois. The building was built in 1916–18, at which time Hyde Park was a popular and growing neighborhood. Architects Rapp & Rapp, who were more famous for their work on theaters, designed the Classical Revival building; the style, which conveyed dignity and luxury to apartment-seekers, was a departure from their more elaborate theater designs. The eleven-and-a-half story building's design includes towers at the front corners, detailed stonework on the first floor, a bracketed stringcourse below the top floor, and a frieze above the top floor. The interior continues the classical theming with wood paneling and egg-and-dart molding. While many luxury apartment buildings were built in Hyde Park in the early 20th century, the Jackson Shore Apartments are one of the few well-preserved surviving examples.

The building was added to the National Register of Historic Places on April 12, 2010.

References

External links

Residential buildings on the National Register of Historic Places in Chicago
Apartment buildings in Chicago
Neoclassical architecture in Illinois
Residential buildings completed in 1918